The Red Sword is a 1929 American silent adventure film directed by Robert G. Vignola and starring William Collier Jr.,  Marian Nixon and Carmel Myers. The film was produced and distributed by FBO Pictures, shortly before it was taken over by RKO Pictures. It was released in Britain by Ideal Films under the alternative title Three Days to Live.

Synopsis
In Tsarist Russia, a Cossack general Litovski rapes the wife of an innkeeper leading to her death. Years later the innkeeper's daughter Vera seeks revenge on the general, even though she is in love with his nephew.

Cast
 William Collier Jr. as Paul
 Marian Nixon as 	Vera
 Carmel Myers as Katherine
 Demetrius Alexis as Veronoff
 Alan Roscoe as Litovski 
 Charles Darvas as 	Fideleff
 Barbara Bozoky as 	Cook

References

Bibliography
 Rainey, Buck. Sweethearts of the Sage: Biographies and Filmographies of 258 actresses appearing in Western movies. McFarland & Company, 1992.

External links
 

1920s American films
1929 films
1929 adventure films
1920s English-language films
American silent feature films
American adventure films
American black-and-white films
Films directed by Robert G. Vignola
Film Booking Offices of America films
Films set in the Russian Empire